Hein-Arne Mathiesen (born 4 April 1971) is a retired Norwegian ski jumper.

In the World Cup he finished once among the top 10, with a ninth place from Willingen in February 1997. He won the Continental Cup in the 1996/97 season.

External links

1971 births
Living people
Norwegian male ski jumpers